I Hope You Don't Mind Me Writing is the fourth studio album by English musician Lucy Spraggan, released on 27 January 2017. The album includes the singles "Dear You" and "Modern Day Frankenstein".

Track listing

Charts

References

Lucy Spraggan albums
2017 albums
Albums produced by Jon Maguire